Sirdar Mountain was named in 1926 by W.P. Hinton; the source of the name is not known. It is located in the Colin Range  of Jasper National Park, Alberta.

See also
 Geography of Alberta

References

Two-thousanders of Alberta
Alberta's Rockies